Ea Bar is a rural commune (xã) and large village in the Buôn Đôn District of Đắk Lắk Province, Vietnam. The commune covers an area of 26 square kilometres and as of 1999 had a population of 14,407 people.

References

Communes of Đắk Lắk province
Populated places in Đắk Lắk province